Víctor Manuel Zúñiga Medina (born 21 March 1996) is a Mexican professional footballer who plays as a winger.

Honours
Mexico U17
CONCACAF U-17 Championship: 2013
FIFA U-17 World Cup runner-up: 2013

References

1996 births
Living people
Association football forwards
Cruz Azul footballers
Venados F.C. players
Cruz Azul Hidalgo footballers
Liga MX players
Ascenso MX players
Liga Premier de México players
People from Nezahualcóyotl
Footballers from the State of Mexico
Mexican footballers